Jim Wych (born 11 January 1955 in Calgary) is a Canadian sports announcer and former professional snooker and pocket billiards player. He turned professional in 1979 and reached the quarter-final of the 1980 World Snooker Championship in his debut year, and reached the world championship quarter-final stage again in 1992. Wych also reached the quarter-finals of two other ranking tournaments, the 1986 British Open and the 1989 European Open. He reached the final of the men's doubles at the 1991 World Masters, playing with Brady Gollan.

A two-time Canadian snooker champion, in 1979 and 1999, Wych retired from professional snooker in 1997 and now works mainly as a television pool and snooker commentator, including for Sky Sports, where he started working in the early 1990s.

Wych was ranked in the top 64 players each year for 15 consecutive seasons, from 1980/1981 to 1994/1995. His highest career ranking was 17, in the snooker world ranking lists for 1980/1981 and 1981/1982.

Career finals

Non-ranking finals: 4

Team finals: 1

Amateur finals: 2 (2 titles)

References

Canadian snooker players
Canadian players of English billiards
Snooker writers and broadcasters
Pool writers and broadcasters
Canadian sports announcers
1954 births
Living people
Place of birth missing (living people)
Sportspeople from Calgary